Cyrtinella is an extinct genus of small-headed flies in the family Acroceridae. The genus is known from Baltic amber from the Eocene of Poland and Kaliningrad Oblast, Russia. It contains only one species, Cyrtinella flavinigra.

The generic name is from the extant genus Cyrtus, referring to the possible close relationship of Cyrtinella with the genus. The specific name is a combination of the Latin words flava (yellow) and nigra (black), referring to the black and yellow coloration of the body.

References

†
Prehistoric Diptera genera
†
†
Baltic amber
Eocene insects